Deandale is an unincorporated community in Steubenville Township, Jefferson County, Ohio, United States.

Located along the Ohio River, Deandale was described as a hamlet in 1910.  The Ohio Valley Brass and Iron Company built a  foundry there in 1911.

References

Unincorporated communities in Jefferson County, Ohio